Annie Lafleur (born 1980 in Montreal) is a Canadian poet from Quebec. She is most noted for her poetry collection Bec-de-lièvre, which was a shortlisted finalist for the Governor General's Award for French-language poetry at the 2017 Governor General's Awards.

Her other poetry collections have included Prolégomènes à mon géant (2007), Handkerchief (2009), Rosebud (2013) and Nouvelles vagues (2014).

References

1980 births
21st-century Canadian poets
Canadian women poets
Canadian poets in French
French Quebecers
Writers from Montreal
Living people
21st-century Canadian women writers
Université Laval alumni